Elizabeth Broadway (born February 16, 1998) is an American actress best known for her role as Emma Shaw in Gen V, and for her roles in The Rookie, Splitting Up Together, Here and Now, and American Pie Presents: Girls' Rules.

Career
In 2021, she was cast in The Boys Presents: Varsity (a spin-off of The Boys) as Emma Shaw. She's represented by Coast to Coast Talent Group.

Filmography

Accolades
For her role in Bones, she was nominated for Best Performance in a TV Series - Guest Starring Young Actress 14–16 at 35th Young Artist Awards.

References

External links
 

21st-century American actresses
American television actresses
Actresses from Toledo, Ohio
Living people
1998 births